Forte Duque de Bragança is a ruined fort located on the islet Ilhéu de Sal Rei off the northwestern coast of the island of Boa Vista, Cape Verde. The fort was named after the Duke of Bragança. The fort overlooks a stretch of coast where the anchorage required defending from piracy and coastal raiding, which were common in the Atlantic Ocean at the time. The island produced salt, which attracted international trade and wealth. It was sacked in 1815 and 1817; this led to the construction of a fort in 1818. Today in ruins, the fort has been partly excavated archaeologically by the University of Cambridge.

See also
Portuguese Empire

References

Braganca Duque
Sal Rei
Braganca duque
Buildings and structures completed in 1818
Portuguese colonial architecture in Cape Verde